Vishishtadvaita (IAST), is a highly regarded school of Hindu philosophy belonging to the Vedanta tradition. Vedanta refers to the profound interpretation of the Vedas based on Prasthanatrayi. Vishishta Advaita, meaning "non-duality with distinctions", is a non-dualistic philosophy that recognizes Brahman as the supreme reality while also acknowledging its multiplicity. This philosophy can be characterized as a form of qualified monism, attributive monism, or qualified non-dualism. It upholds the belief that all diversity ultimately stems from a fundamental underlying unity.

Ramanuja, the 11–12th century philosopher and the main proponent of Vishishtadvaita philosophy contends that the Prasthanatrayi ("The three courses"), namely the Upanishads, the Bhagavad Gita, and the Brahma Sutras are to be interpreted in a way that shows this unity in diversity, for any other way would violate their consistency. Vedanta Desika, another major scholar who significantly helped expand the philophy of Vishitadvaita, defines Vishishtadvaita using the statement, Asesha Chit-Achit Prakaaram Brahmaikameva Tatvam: Brahman, as qualified by the sentient and insentient modes (or attributes), is the only reality.

History
The Vishishtadvaitic philosophy is believed to have a long history, with its earliest works no longer available. The names of these earliest philosophers are only mentioned in Ramanuja's Vedartha Sangraham. Bodhayana, Dramida, Tanka, Guhadeva, Kapardi, and Bharuci are some of the well-known philosophers in the line of those who are thought to have developed the Vishishtadvaitic system.

Bodhayana is considered to have written an extensive vritti (commentary) on the Purva and Uttara Mimamsas. Tanka is attributed with having written commentaries on Chandogya Upanishad and Brahma Sutras. Nathamuni of the ninth century AD, the foremost Acharya of the Vaishnavas, collected the Tamil prabandhas, classified them, made the redaction, set the hymns to music and spread them everywhere. He is said to have received the divine hymns straight from Nammalvar, the foremost of the twelve Alvars, by yogic insight in the temple at Alwar Thirunagari, which is located near Tirunelveli in South India. Yamunacharya renounced kingship and spent his last days in the service of the Lord at Srirangam and in laying the fundamentals of the Vishishtadvaita philosophy by writing four basic works on the subject.

Ramanuja is the main proponent of Vishishtadvaita philosophy.  Ramanuja continues along the line of thought of his predecessors while expounding the knowledge expressed in the Upanishads, Brahma Sutras and Bhagavad Gita. Vedanta Desika and Pillai Lokacharya, disciples in the tradition of Ramanuja, had minor disagreements not on the philosophy, but on some aspects of the theology, giving rise to the Vadakalai and Thenkalai schools of thought.

Swaminarayan, the founder of Swaminarayan Sampraday, propagated a related philosophy, and based the Swaminarayan Sampraday (original name is Uddhava Sampraday) partly on these ideals.

Key principles 
There are three key principles of Vishishtadvaita:
 Tattva: The knowledge of the 3 real entities namely, jiva (living souls; the sentient); ajiva (the nonsentient) and Ishvara (Vishnu-Narayana or Parahbrahman, Supreme-self and the cause of all manifestations and in-dwelling giver of grace based on Karma).
 Hita: The means of realization, as through bhakti (devotion) and prapatti (self-surrender)
 Purushartha: The goal to be attained, as moksha or liberation from bondage.
Vivishta means most exclusive (not equal / different from rest).

Epistemology

Pramanas 
Pramana refers to the correct knowledge, arrived by thorough reasoning, of any object. Pramana ("sources of knowledge", Sanskrit) forms one part of a triputi (trio).
 Pramatir, the subject; the knower of the knowledge
 Pramana, the cause or the means of the knowledge
 Prameya, the object of knowledge

In Vishishtadvaita Vedanta, only the following three pramanas are accepted as valid means of knowledge:
 Pratyaksa — the knowledge gained by means of perception. Perception refers to knowledge obtained by cognition of external objects based on sensory perception.  In modern-day usage this will also include knowledge obtained by means of observation through scientific instruments since they are an extension of perception.
 Anumana — the knowledge gained by means of inference. Inference refers to knowledge obtained by deductive reasoning and analysis.
 Shabda — the knowledge gained by means of shruti. Shruti refers to knowledge gained from scriptures - primarily the Upanishads, the Brahma Sutras and the Bhagavad Gita.

Rules of epistemology
There are three rules of hierarchy when there is apparent conflict between the three modes of acquiring knowledge:
 Shabda or Shruti, Pramana occupies the highest position in matters which cannot be settled or resolved by pratyaksa (perception) or by anumana (inference).
 Anumana occupies the next position. When an issue cannot be settled through sensory perception alone, it is settled based on inference, that is, whichever is the more logical argument.
 When pratyaksa yields a definitive position on a particular issue, such a perception cannot be ignored by interpreting Shabda in a way which violates that perception.

Metaphysics

Ontology

The ontology in Vishishtadvaita consists of explaining the relationship between Ishvara (Parabrahman), the sentient beings (chit-brahman) and the insentient Universe (achit-brahman). In the broadest sense, Ishvara is the Universal Soul of the pan-organistic body consisting of the Universe and sentient beings. The three ontological entities are described below:

Ishvara

Ishvara (denoted by Vishnu (Narayana)) is the Supreme Cosmic Spirit who maintains complete control over the Universe and all the sentient beings, which together also form the pan-organistic body of Ishvara. The triad of Ishvara along with the universe and the sentient beings is Brahman, which signifies the completeness of existence. Ishvara is Parabrahman endowed with innumerable auspicious qualities (Kalyana Gunas). Ishvara is perfect, omniscient, omnipresent, incorporeal, independent, the creator of the universe, its active ruler and also its eventual destroyer. He is causeless, eternal and unchangeable — and is yet the material and the efficient cause of the universe and sentient beings. He is both immanent (like whiteness in milk) and transcendent (like a watch-maker independent of a watch). He is the subject of worship. He is the basis of morality and giver of the fruits of one's Karma. He rules the world with His Maya — His divine power.

Ishvara is considered to have a 2-fold characteristic: he is the indweller of all beings and all beings dwell in Ishvara.

Antarvyapi

When Ishvara is thought of as the indweller of all beings, he is referred to as the Paramatman, or the innermost self of all beings.

He who inhabits water, yet is within water, whom water does not know, whose body water is and who controls water from within — He is your Self, the Inner Controller, the Immortal.

He who inhabits the sun, yet is within the sun, whom the sun does not know, whose body the sun is and who controls the sun from within — He is your Self, the Inner Controller, the Immortal - Brihadaranyaka Upanishad 3.7.4-14

Bahuvyapi

When Ishvara is thought of as the all encomposing and the residence of all beings that is, all beings reside in Ishvara, he is referred to as the paramapurusha. The sentient beings and the insentient universe which form part of the pan-organistic body of Ishvara are encapsulated by Ishvara.

Sarvam khalv idam Brahma Chandogya Upanishad

Isavasyam idam sarvam Isha Upanishad

Chit

Chit is the world of sentient beings, or of entities possessing consciousness. It is similar to the Purusha of Samkhya system. The sentient beings are called Jivas and they are possessors of individual consciousness as denoted by "I". The scope of Chit refers to all beings with an "I" consciousness, or more specifically self-awareness. Therefore, all entities which are aware of their own individual existence are denoted as chit. This is called dharmi-jnana or substantive consciousness. The sentient beings also possess varying levels of dharma-bhuta-jnana or attributive consciousness

The jivas possess three different types of existence:
 Nityas, or the eternally free Jivas who were never in Samsara
 Muktas, or the Jivas that were once in Samsara but are free
 Baddhas, or the Jivas which are still in Samsara pavana (due to Karma and Ignorance)

Achit
Achit is the world of insentient entities as denoted by matter or more specifically the non-conscious Universe. It is similar to the Prakriti of Samkhya system.

Brahman
There is a subtle difference between Ishvara and Brahman. Ishvara is the substantive part of Brahman, while jivas and jagat are its modes (also secondary attributes), and kalyana-gunas (auspicious attributes) are the primary attributes. The secondary attributes become manifested in the effect state when the world is differentiated by name and form. The kalyana-gunas are eternally manifest.

Brahman is the description of Ishvara when comprehended in fullness– i.e., a simultaneous vision of Ishvara with all his modes and attributes. 

The relationship between Brahman and Jivas, Jagat is expressed by Rāmānujā in numerous ways. He calls this relationship as one of:
 sharIra/sharIrI        (body/indweller);
 prakAra/prakArI      (attribute or mode/substance);
 ‌shesha/sheshi          (Owned/owner);
 amsha/amshI            (part/whole);
 AdhAradeya/sambandha (supporter/supported);
 niyamya/niyanta      (controlled/controller);
 rakshya/rakshaka      (redeemed/redeemer);

These relationships can be experienced holding Brahman as the father, son, mother, sister, wife, husband, friend, lover and lord. Hence, Brahman is a personal being.
 What does Nirguna Brahman mean?

Ramanuja argues vehemently against understanding Brahman as one without attributes. Brahman is Nirguna in the sense that impure qualities do not touch it. He provides three valid reasons for staking such a claim:

Shruti/Shabda Pramana: All shrutis and shabdas denoting Brahman always list either attributes inherent to Brahman or not inherent to Brahman. The shrutis only seek to deny Brahman from possessing impure and defective qualities which affect the world of beings. There is evidence in the shrutis to this regard. The shrutis proclaim Brahman to be beyond the tri-gunas which are observed. However, Brahman possesses an infinite number of transcendental attributes, the evidence of which is given in vakhyas like "satyam jnanam anantam Brahma" (Taittiriya Upanishad).

Pratyaksha Pramana: Ramanuja states that "a contentless cognition is impossible". And all cognition must necessarily involve knowing Brahman through the attributes of Brahman.

Anumana Pramana: Ramanuja states that "Nirgunatva" itself becomes an attribute of Brahman on account of the uniqueness of no other entity being Nirguna.
Ramanuja had simplified relationship between bramha and soul. According to him though soul is integral part of bramha it has independent existence.

Theory of Existence
The three ontological entities i.e. Ishvara, Chit and Achit are fundamentally real. It upholds the doctrine of Satkaryavada as against Asatkaryavada.

Briefly,
 Satkaryavada is pre-existence of the effect in the cause. It maintains that karya (effect) is sat or real.  It is present in the karana (cause) in a potential form, even before its manifestation.
 Asatkaryavada is non-existence of the effect in the cause.  It maintains that karya (effect) is asat or unreal until it comes into being.  Every effect, then, is a new beginning and is not born out of cause.

More specifically, the effect is a modification of what exists in the cause and does not involve new entities coming into existence.  This is called as parinamavada or evolution of effect from the cause.  This doctrine is common to the Samkhya system and Vishishtadvaita system.  The Samkhya system adheres to Prakriti-Parinama vada whereas Vishishtadvaita is a modified form of Brahma-Parinama vada.

Brahman as the cause does not become the Universe as the effect.

Brahman is assigned two  (ways of being the cause):

  — Being the Efficient/ Instrumental cause. For example, a goldsmith is assigned  as he acts as the maker of jewellery and thus becomes the jewellery's Instrumental cause.
  — Being the material cause. For example, the gold is assigned  as it acts as the material of the jewellery and thus becomes the jewellery's material cause.

According to Vishishtadvaita, the Universe and Sentients always exist. However, they begin from a subtle state and undergo transformation. The subtle state is called a causal state, while the transformed state is called the effect state. The causal state is when Brahman is internally not distinguishable by name and form.

It can be said that Vishishtadvaita follows Brahma-Prakara-Parinama Vada. That is to say, it is the modes (Jivas and Jagat) of Brahman which is under evolution. The cause and effect only refer to the pan-organistic body transformation. Brahman as the Universal Self is unchanging and eternal.

Brahman having the subtle (sūkṣma) chit and achit entities as his Śarīra/Prakāra(body/mode) before manifestation is the same Brahman having the expanded (sthūla) chit and achit entities as Śarīra/Prakāra(body/mode) after manifestation.

The essential feature is that the underlying entity is the same, the changes are in the description of that entity.

For e.g. Jack was a baby. Jack was a small kid. Jack was a middle-aged person. Jack was an old man. Jack is dead

The body of a single personality named Jack is described as continuously changing. Jack does not become "James" because of the change.

Ethics

Souls and Matter are only the body of God. Creation is a real act of God. It is the expansion of intelligence. Matter is fundamentally real and undergoes real revelation. The Soul is a higher mode than Matter, because it is conscious. It is also eternally real and eternally distinct. Final release, that comes, by the Lord's Grace, after the death of the body is a Communion with God. This philosophy believes in liberation through one's Karmas (actions) in accordance with the Vedas, the Varna (caste or class) system and the four Ashramas (stages of life), along with intense devotion to Vishnu. Individual Souls retain their separate identities even after moksha. They live in Fellowship with God either serving Him or meditating on Him. The philosophy of this school is SriVaishnavism, a branch of Vaishnavism.

Interpretation of Mahāvākyas
1. sarvam khalv idam brahma from Chandogya Upanishad 3.14.1

Translated literally, this means All this is Brahman. The ontology of Vishishtadvaita system consists of:

a. Ishvara is Para-brahman with infinite superlative qualities, whose substantive nature imparts the existence to the modes

b. Jivas are chit-brahman or sentient beings (which possess consciousness). They are the modes of Brahman which show consciousness.

c. Jagat is achit-brahman or matter/Universe (which are non-conscious). They are the mode of Brahman which are not conscious.

Brahman is the composite whole of the triad consisting of Ishvara along with his modes i.e. Jivas and Jagat.

2. ayam ātmā brahma from Mandukya Upanishad 1.2

Translated literally, this means the Self is Brahman.
From the earlier statement, it follows that on account of everything being Brahman, the self is not different from Brahman.

3. Tat tvam asi from Chandogya Upanishad 6.8.7

Translated literally, it means Thou art that

that here refers to Brahman and thou refers to jiva

Rāmānujā chooses to take the position of universal identity. He interprets this passage to mean the subsistence of all attributes in a common underlying substratum. This is referred to as samānādhikāraṇya. Thus Rāmānujā says the purport of the passage is to show the unity of all beings in a common base. Ishvara (Parabrahman) who is the Cosmic Spirit for the pan-organistic body consisting of the Universe and sentient beings, is also  simultaneously the innermost self (Ātman) for each individual sentient being (Jīva). All the bodies, the Cosmic and the individual, are held in an adjectival relationship (aprithak-siddhi) in the one Isvara.

Tat tvam asi declares that oneness of Ishvara.

When multiple entities point to a single object, the relationship is established as one of substance and its attributes.

For e.g. in a statement:

Jack is a tall and intelligent boy

The descriptors tall-ness, intelligence and boy-ness all refer to a common underlying Jack

Similarly, when the Upanishads declare Brahman is the Universe, Purusha, Self, Prana, Vayu, and so on, the entities are attributes or modes of Brahman.

If the statement tat tvam asi is taken to mean as only the self is Brahman, then sarvam khalv idam brahma will not make sense.

Understanding Neti-Neti

This is an Upanishadic concept which is employed while attempting to know Brahman. The purport of this exercise is understood in many different ways and also influences the understanding of Brahman.
In the overall sense, this phrase is accepted to refer to the indescribable nature of Brahman who is beyond all rationalisations.

Taittiriya Upanishad 2-9-1 passage "yato vacho nivartante.."  (words recoil, mind can not grasp...) etc., state the same concept regarding Brahman.  The visishtadvaita interpretation is that these passages do not indicate  a black hole, but the incompleteness of any statement or thought or concept concerning Brahman.  Brahman is these and more. This interpretation is consistent with "sarvam khalv idam brahma".  Antaryami Brahmana of Brihadaranyaka Upanishad passage "yasya prithvi shariram yasya atma shariram"  is also interpreted to show that Brahman is not a zero point - "nirvisesha chinmatra" (an entity which has nothing except existence)

The typical interpretation of Neti-Neti is not this, not this or neither this, nor that. It is a phrase meant to convey the inexpressibility of Brahman in words and the futility of trying to approximate Brahman with conceptual models. In VisishtAdvaita, the phrase is taken in the sense of not just this, not just this or not just this, not just that. This means that Brahman cannot be restricted to one specific or a few specific descriptions. Consequently, Brahman is understood to possess infinite qualities and each of these qualities are infinite in extent.

Purpose of human existence
The purpose or goal of human existence is called purushartha. According to the Vedas, there are four goals namely artha (wealth), kama (pleasure), dharma (righteousness) and moksha (permanent freedom from worldly bondage). According to this philosophy, the first three goals are not an end by themselves but need to be pursued with the ideal of attaining moksha.

Moksha (Liberation)
Moksha means liberation or release from samsara, the cycle of rebirth. In Vishishtadvaita, baddha (bounded) jiva is only self-aware and is in a state of ignorance of sharira-shariri relationship. Karma loaded with countless births and deaths in samsara keeps the jiva from dharma-bhuta-jnana (attributive consciousness) of God. With creation process of Isvara, evolving through different bodies, jiva attains human body in which it puts effort to gain true nature of self and true knowledge of God through Bhakti and attains liberated state with grace of God. Liberation simply means gaining true knowledge of God and serving God in Vaikuntha (God's abode). In liberation, jiva keeps its individuality and has infinte knowledge and bliss like Brahman, but doesn't become one with Brahman. Unlike advaita, liberation is only after death (videhamukti) and there is no concept of jivanmukti.

Bhakti as the means of attaining  moksha
Bhakti is the sole means of liberation in Vishishtadvaita. Through Bhakti (devotion), a Jiva ascends to Vaikuntha, where it continues to delight in His service in a body which is sat-cit-ananda. Karma Yoga and Jnana Yoga are sub processes of Bhakti, total surrender, as the devotee acquires the knowledge that the Lord is the inner self. A devotee realizes his own state as dependent on, and supported by, and being led by the Lord, who is the Master. One is to lead a life as an instrument of the Lord, offering all his thought, word, and deed to the feet of the Lord. One is to see the Lord in everything and everything in Him. This is the unity in diversity achieved through devotion.
However Shri Ramanuja accepts Sharanagati, total surrender at the Lord's lotus feet alone as the sole means to moksha. Wherein, moksha is defined as liberation from samsara and going to Vaikuntha to serve Narayana (Balaji)in a spiritual body. This is a distinguishing feature of this school of philosophy, as both Adishankara's advaita and Anandatirtha's dvaita accept bhakti for two different concepts of moksha. Swami Ramanuja has supported this opinion with various citations directly from the vedas, and various incidents highlighting sharangathi as means to attain personal stay in the realm of Vaikuntha. Observing total surrender at the Lord's feet guarantees moksha at the end of this birth, and in the time between sharanagathi and death, the surrendered soul must spend his time performing the nice forms of devotion. So bhakti is not a moksha sadhana, but for anubhāva (experience) and reaching Vaikuntha, in the Vishishtadvaita Sampradaya.

Thenkalai and Vadakalai schools of thought 
The Sri vaishnava tradition has two major sub-traditions in Tamil word called Vadakalai (northern) and Thenkalai (southern). The Vadakalai  sect of Sri Vaishnavism associate themselves with Vedanta Desikan and Ramanujacharya. Vedanta Desikan is one of the foremost learned scholars and philosophers of medieval India, who has written more than a hundred works in Sanskrit and Tamil, Prakrit and Manipravala.  He is said to have been born as an incarnation of the divine bell of Lord Venkateshwara of Tirupati and also of Ramanujacharya in the month of Purattasi under the star Thiruvonam (Sravana), in the year 1268 CE. All of his works are characterized by his versatility, irrefutable reasoning, logic, examination, deep spiritual insight, ethical fervour and excellent expressions of devotional emotion in delightful style. His Paduka-sahasram and Rahasyatrayasaram are some classic examples.  He was a great teacher, logician, expositor, debater, poet, philosopher, thinker and defender of the faith of Vaishnavism. "Kavitaarkika Simham" (lion among poets and debaters), "Sarvatantra Svatantrar" (all-knowing and all-powerful), "Vedaantaachaarya" (the master and preceptor of the Vedanta) are some of the titles attributed to him.

Pillai Lokacharya literally meaning "Teacher for the whole world" is one of the leading lights on the Sri Vaishnava Vedanta philosophy. His work Sri Vachana Bhusanam is a classic and provides the essence of Upanishads. The Tenkalai sect of Sri Vaishnavism looks up to him apart from Swami Ramanuja and Swami Manavala Mamuni. He was a senior contemporary of Vedanta Desika. He is said to have been born as an amsa ("essence") of Kanchi Devaraja (Varadaraja) Perumal to document and immortalize Ramanuja's message in the month of Aippaci under the star Thiruvonam (Sravana), in the year 1205 CE.  He is said to have lived for 106 years, during which time, he also helped to safeguard the idol of Ranganatha at Srirangam from Muslim invaders.  Pillai Lokacharya confirmed the basics of the Sri Vaishnava system in his 18 monumental works popularly known as Ashtadasa Rahasyangal ("the eighteen secrets") also called the Rahasya granthas ("doctrines that explain the inner meanings") out of which Sri Vachana Bhushanam and Mumukshuppadi are the most famous. Manavala Mamuni expanded on and popularized Lokacharya's teachings arguments in Tamil.

Traditions following Vishishtadvaita
 Sri Vaishnava Sampradaya of southern India
 Sri Ramanandi Sect of Northern India, it has the largest monastic order in whole India
 Dāmodariya Vaiśņava sampraday of Assam
Swaminarayan sampradaya of Gujarat

Visishtadvaita and Sri Vaishnavism 

The Absolute Supreme Reality referred to as Brahman, is a Transcendent Personality. He is Narayana, also known as Lord Vishnu.

A man who has discrimination for his charioteer and holds the reins of the mind firmly, reaches the end of the road; and that is the supreme position of Vishnu. - 1.3.9 Katha Upanishad

Beyond the senses are the objects; beyond the objects is the mind; beyond the mind, the intellect; beyond the intellect, the Great Atman; beyond the Great Atman, the Unmanifest; beyond the Unmanifest, the Purusha. Beyond the Purusha there is nothing: this is the end, the Supreme Goal.- 1.3.10,11 Katha Upanishad

In terms of theology, Ramanujacharya puts forth the view that both the Supreme Goddess Lakshmi and Supreme God Narayana together constitute Brahman - the Absolute. Sri Lakshmi is the female personification of Brahman and Narayana is the male personification of Brahman, but they are both inseparable, co-eternal, co-absolute and are always substantially one. Thus, in reference to these dual aspects of Brahman, the Supreme is referred as Sriman Narayana in the Sri Vaishnava Sampradaya.

The most striking difference between Srivaishnavas and other Vaishnava groups lies in their interpretation of Vedas. While other Vaishnava groups interpret Vedic deities like Indra, Savitar, Bhaga, Rudra, etc. to be same as their Puranic counterparts, Srivaishnavas consider these to be different names/roles/forms of Lord Narayan citing solid reasons thus claiming that the entire Veda is dedicated for Vishnu worship alone. Srivaishnavas have remodelled Pancharatra homas like Sudarshana homa, etc. to include Vedic Suktas like Rudram in them, thus giving them a Vedic outlook.

See also
 Turiya
 Achintya Bheda Abheda
 Virashaivism
 Shiva Advaita
 Suddhadvaita
 Dvaitadvaita

References

External links
 The Siddhanta Sangraha, English translation from the 18th century

Hindu philosophy
Vaishnavism
Schools and traditions in ancient Indian philosophy
Vishishtadvaita Vedanta
Nondualism
Vedanta